Surchandra Singh Chandam (born 5 January 1994) is an Indian professional footballer who plays as a winger for I-League club NEROCA.

Career
Born in Manipur, Singh started his career with Langsning in the I-League 2nd Division before moving to I-League side DSK Shivajians. He made his debut for DSK Shivajians on 17 January 2016 against Sporting Goa.

Rajasthan United
In August 2022, Rajasthan United secured the signature of Singh ahead of the Durand Cup campaign. He left the club a month later without making a single appearance.

NEROCA
In September 2022, Singh joined I-League club NEROCA on a one-year deal. On 5 September, he made his debut for the club Chennaiyin in the Durand Cup, which ended in a 2–0 loss.

Career statistics

Club

Honours

Real Kashmir
 IFA Shield: 2021

References

1994 births
Living people
Indian footballers
DSK Shivajians FC players
Churchill Brothers FC Goa players
Association football midfielders
Footballers from Manipur
I-League 2nd Division players
I-League players
Mohun Bagan AC players
Real Kashmir FC players
East Bengal Club players
Mumbai City FC players
Indian Super League players
Rajasthan United FC players